This is a list of shopping malls in Ukraine listed by size.

List

References

Links 
  The most visited shopping malls in Ukraine forbes.net.ua, November 6, 2012
  Newbuilding in Ukraine vn.com.ua, December 24, 2021

Ukraine
Shopping malls